Richard Adrian Scholtes (born 18 March 1934) is a retired United States Army major general who served as the first commander of Joint Special Operations Command. Scholtes' experience as the commander of Joint Special Operations Task Force 123 during the United States invasion of Grenada made him an important figure in the reorganization of the US special operations community. After his tenure as JSOC commander, Scholtes retired from active service so he could candidly testify in August 1986 before Congress about the perceived need for a separate, four-star, special operations command. Then-Senator William Cohen described Scholtes' testimony as vital in the decision of Congress to create the United States Special Operations Command.

Scholtes enlisted in the Army on 31 October 1951. He is a 1957 graduate of the United States Military Academy with a B.S. degree in military science. Scholtes later earned an M.B.A. degree in data processing from George Washington University.

Awards and decorations

Unidentified jump wings

References

1934 births
Living people
People from Joliet, Illinois
United States Army soldiers
United States Military Academy alumni
United States Army Rangers
United States Army personnel of the Vietnam War
Recipients of the Air Medal
Recipients of the Soldier's Medal
Recipients of the Silver Star
Recipients of the Gallantry Cross (Vietnam)
George Washington University alumni
Recipients of the Meritorious Service Medal (United States)
Recipients of the Legion of Merit
United States Army generals
Recipients of the Defense Superior Service Medal